Chittenango Creek is a small river in central New York, United States. The creek partially forms the boundary between Onondaga County and Madison County.

Course

Chittenango Creek originates in Nelson Swamp in the town of Fenner in Madison County. It receives the outflow for Cazenovia Lake near the village of Cazenovia. From there it flows northward, passing over a  waterfall in Chittenango Falls State Park before flowing through the village of Chittenango. The creek flows out into Oneida Lake near the community of Bridgeport.

Tributaries
 Limestone Creek
 Meadow Brook

See also
List of rivers in New York

References

External links

Rivers of New York (state)
Rivers of Madison County, New York
Rivers of Onondaga County, New York
Cazenovia, New York